Elizabeth Ann Donley (born April 5, 1970) is an American physicist. She is a researcher in the time and frequency division at the Physical Measurement Laboratory. Donley's research areas include the operation and development of atomic fountain clocks and chip scale atomic devices and instruments.

Education 
Donley was born on April 5, 1970. She completed a B.S. in physics from University of Nevada, Las Vegas in 1994. Donley earned a M.S. in physics at the University of Colorado Boulder in 1996. Donley completed her doctoral studies in Switzerland, earning a Ph.D. in natural sciences from ETH Zurich in 2000. Her thesis was titled Single-molecule spectroscopy at subkelvin temperatures. Donley's doctoral advisor was Urs Wild. Her postdoctoral research at the University of Colorado Boulder was on ultracold atomic physics with 2001 Nobel Laureates Carl Wieman and Eric Cornell.

Career 
She joined the National Institute of Standards and Technology in 2002 as a research physicist in the Time and Frequency Division at the Physical Measurement Laboratory; in 2018 she became its Division Chief. She has served in a number of leadership positions for the IEEE professional society. Donley's research areas include the operation and development of atomic fountain clocks and chip scale atomic devices and instruments, for which she has won the Department of Commerce Gold Medal in 2004 and 2014.

References

External links 

 

Living people
Place of birth missing (living people)
National Institute of Standards and Technology people
American women physicists
20th-century American physicists
21st-century American physicists
20th-century American women scientists
21st-century American women scientists
University of Nevada, Las Vegas alumni
University of Colorado Boulder alumni
ETH Zurich alumni
1970 births